Patrizia Lanfredini (born 3 April 1957 in Florence) is an Italian former freestyle swimmer who competed in the 1972 Summer Olympics.

References

1957 births
Living people
Sportspeople from Florence
Italian female freestyle swimmers
Olympic swimmers of Italy
Swimmers at the 1972 Summer Olympics
Mediterranean Games gold medalists for Italy
Swimmers at the 1975 Mediterranean Games
Mediterranean Games medalists in swimming
20th-century Italian women
21st-century Italian women